The 1971–72 Hellenic Football League season was the 19th in the history of the Hellenic Football League, a football competition in England.

Premier Division

The Premier Division featured 15 clubs which competed in the division last season, along with two new clubs, promoted from Division One:
Hungerford Town
Pressed Steel

League table

Division One A

The Division One A featured 8 clubs which competed in the Division One last season, along with 5 new clubs:
Swindon Town 'A', relegated from the Premier Division
Burnham, joined from the Reading Combination
Easington Sports, joined from the Oxfordshire Senior League
Long Wittenham
MG Athletic

League table

Division One B

The Division One B featured 10 clubs which competed in the Division One last season, along with 4 new clubs:
Amersham Town, relegated from the Premier Division
Garsington
Maidenhead Social
Oxford University Press

League table

References

External links
 Hellenic Football League

1971-72
H